Johannes Hymonides, known as John the Deacon of Rome (d. between 876 and 882), was a deacon of the Roman Church. Few details are known of his life: after the death of St Nicholas I, he was briefly exiled from Rome at the behest of the emperor Louis II, but was recalled by Adrian II. Possessed of considerable learning, he was closely associated with Anastasius, Librarian of the Roman Church (died 879).

At the instance of Pope John VIII (872-82), John wrote a life of St. Gregory the Great, making use of the works of this pope and above all of extracts made at an earlier date from the pope's letters in the archives of the Roman Church. The work is divided into four books: in the first he gives an account of the life of Gregory up to the time of his pontificate; in the second, of his activities as pope; in the third, of his teachings; and in the fourth, of his progress in perfection. The life was most recently edited by the Maurists. For John VIII, John also composed in 876 an adaptation of the Cena Cypriani.

John also intended to write a detailed history of the Church, and at his request the aforesaid Anastasius compiled a history in three parts (tripartita) from Greek sources for the use of John, whose purpose, however, was never executed. On the invitation of Bishop Gaudericus of Velletri (867-79), he undertook to re-edit the Gesta Clementis, a life of Pope Clement I (died about end of the 1st century), but did not live to finish the work, which Gaudericus undertook to complete, though it never appeared in full. 

A letter from a certain Johannes Diaconus to Senarius, "vir illustris", treats of the ceremonies of baptism; it is not however, the work of the John treated here, but of an older deacon of this name. The short commentary on the Heptateuch based on patristic sources in  Bibliothèque Nationale manuscript Lat. 12309 is also no longer attributed to John.

References

 
P. Chiesa, Giovanni Diacono, Dizionaria Biografico degli Italiani, vol. 56 (2001, Rome), 4-7.

Italian religious writers
9th-century births
9th-century deaths
9th-century Latin writers
Writers from the Carolingian Empire
Deacons
9th-century Italian writers
9th-century historians